Ichinomiya Asama Shrine may refer to:

 Ichinomiya Asama Shrine (Fuefuki),
 Ichinomiya Asama Shrine (Ichikawamisato)